Parastenocarididae is a family of copepods in the order Harpacticoida adapted to life in groundwater. It contains the following genera:

Asiacaris Cottarelli, Bruno & Berera, 2010
Brasilibathynellocaris Jakobi, 1972
Brinckicaris Jakobi, 1972
Clujensicaris Jakobi, 1972
Dussartstenocaris Karanovic & Cooper, 2011
Eirinicaris Corgosinho, 2017
Enckellicaris Jakobi, 1972
Entzicaris Jakobi, 1972
Fontinalicaris Jakobi, 1972
Forficatocaris Jakobi, 1969
Italicocaris Jakobi, 1972
Kinnecaris Jakobi, 1972
Lacustricaris Jakobi, 1972
Macacocaris Jakobi, 1972
Michelicaris Jakobi, 1972
Monodicaris Schminke, 2009
Murunducaris Reid, 1994
Nanacaris Jakobi, 1972
Nipponicaris Jakobi, 1972
Oshimaensicaris Jakobi, 1972
Pannonicaris Jakobi, 1972
Parastenocaris Kessler, 1913
Phreaticaris Jakobi, 1972
Potamocaris Dussart, 1979
Proserpinicaris Jakobi, 1972
Remaneicaris Jakobi, 1972
Simplicaris Galassi & De Laurentiis, 2004
Siolicaris Jakobi, 1972
Stammericaris Jakobi, 1972

References

External links

Harpacticoida
Crustacean families